Nicolai Meyer (born 21 July 1993) is a Danish professional ice hockey forward who is currently playing for EC Red Bull Salzburg of the ICE Hockey League (ICEHL).

Playing career
In his third season in his return to Sweden in the HockeyAllsvenskan in 2018–19, Meyer broke out offensively with Södertälje SK, producing 29 goals and 62 points in 52 games, to lead the team and the Allsvenskan in each offensive category.

On April 17, 2019, he was rewarded with the two-year SHL contract in returning to former club, Malmö Redhawks.

Career statistics

Regular season and playoffs

International

References

External links

1993 births
Living people
Aalborg Pirates players
Ässät players
Danish ice hockey forwards
Frederikshavn White Hawks players
Ice hockey players at the 2022 Winter Olympics
Olympic ice hockey players of Denmark
People from Frederikshavn
Malmö Redhawks players
HC Plzeň players
EC Red Bull Salzburg players
Södertälje SK players
Sportspeople from the North Jutland Region
Tingsryds AIF players
IF Troja/Ljungby players
Västerviks IK players
Vienna Capitals players
Danish expatriate sportspeople in the Czech Republic
Danish expatriate sportspeople in Sweden
Danish expatriate sportspeople in Finland
Expatriate ice hockey players in the Czech Republic
Expatriate ice hockey players in Sweden
Expatriate ice hockey players in Finland
Danish expatriate ice hockey people